Strato III Philopator (epither means "the Father-loving") was an Indo-Greek king who ruled c. 25 BCE to 10 CE. He is only known through the joint coins with his father Strato II. He may have been supplanted, in conjunction with his father or later as an independent king, by the Indo-Scythian Northern Satraps, particularly Rajuvula and Bhadayasa, whose coins were often copied. Strato was the last of the line of Diodotus and independent Hellenistic king to rule at his death in 10 AD.

Coinage
Strato III may  also have issued coins on his own, but these are rare and unconfirmed.
A few silver coins with a different portrait and the inscription Strato Soter Dikaios ("the just") may also belong to Strato III as sole ruler, or to a fourth king named Strato.

Just like the earlier king Strato I, Strato III is thought to belong to the dynasty of Menander I, who also used the epithet Soter and the symbol of standing Pallas Athena.

The chronology of the late Indo-Greek kingdom has been established by Bopearachchi and other scholars from numismatical evidence alone. The coins deteriorated continuously, the Strato coins being the most debased and crude in style, a striking contrast to earlier kings who struck some of the most beautiful coins of antiquity. The decay was due to the increasing pressure of the Indo-Scythian nomads on the remaining Greek pockets, as well as their long isolation from the rest of the Hellenistic world.

Strato II, Strato III and Strato Dikaios struck debased silver drachms, which as mentioned portray Pallas on the reverse. Strato II appears as an old man with a sunken jaw on some of his coins, which is not surprising given that his grandson was co-regent. Strato II also issued bronzes and even lead coins of the common type Apollo/tripod. On some of Strato II's silver drachms the letter sigma is written as C, a not uncommon trait on late Hellenistic coins in the east.

Imitations by Indo-Scythian rulers

Subsequent Indo-Scythian rulers, who replaced the Stratos in their territories, designed their coins in direct imitation of those of Strato II and Strato III. This is the case of the Northern Satraps, who ruled in the territories from Sagala in Eastern Punjab to Mathura, such as Rajuvula.

Just as the Yuezhi had copied the coins of the last Greco-Bactrian ruler Heliocles in Bactria, or the Indo-Scythians had copied the coins of the last western Indo-Greek ruler Hermaios in the area of Kabul, here again the Indo-Scythian Northern Satraps relied heavily on the numismatics of their predecessors.

See also
 Indo-Greek Kingdom
 Greco-Buddhism
 Indo-Scythians

Notes and references
Notes

References

Bibliography
 At the Internet Archive.

External links
  Les Rois Straton II et III
 Coin India Strato II and III

Indo-Greek kings
1st-century BC rulers in Asia
1st-century monarchs in Asia
Euthydemid dynasty